R. H. Anderson may refer to the following people:
 Robert Henry Anderson, botanist
 Richard H. Anderson (general), Confederate general
 Robert H. Anderson, Confederate general
 Rob Anderson (politician), Canadian politician
 Robert H. Anderson (politician), American politician
 Richard H. Anderson (pilot), United States Air Force pilot in World War II
 Richard H. Anderson (businessman), American lawyer and airline executive

See also
Anderson (surname)
Richard Anderson (disambiguation)
Robert Anderson (disambiguation)